Robert Rayburn may refer to:

 Robert G. Rayburn
 Robert S. Rayburn